Alfred George Horton (c.1843–11 March 1903) was a New Zealand printer, newspaper proprietor and editor, businessman. He was a part-owner of The New Zealand Herald. He died at Auckland on 11 March 1903. Within months, his two business partners also died and ownership of the Herald went to his son, Henry Horton, later in 1903.

References

1840s births
1903 deaths
New Zealand businesspeople
People from Lincolnshire
English emigrants to New Zealand
New Zealand writers